IfNotNow is an American Jewish progressive activist group opposing the Israeli occupation of the West Bank and Gaza Strip. The IfNotNow movement consists of young Jewish Americans who demonstrate against politicians, US Government policies, and Jewish institutions perceived to support the occupation, primarily through direct action and media appearances.

Founding 
IfNotNow was founded in July 2014 to protest American Jewish institutional support for Israel's actions during the 2014 Israel–Gaza conflict. The name IfNotNow is derived from a saying by the 1st century Jewish sage Hillel the Elder: "If I am not for myself, who will be for me? And being for myself, what am 'I'? And if not now, when?" Their first action was to recite the Jewish prayer of mourning, the Mourner's Kaddish, for all Palestinian and Israeli victims of the war outside the offices of the Conference of Presidents of Major American Jewish Organizations.

Strategy 
IfNotNow is a movement-based organization, designed to appeal directly to the public through social media and direct action; their refusal to participate in closed-door meetings has been criticized by leaders of established Jewish institutions. As part of the broader #JewishResistance coalition, IfNotNow has sought to highlight similarities and ties between the Trump administration and the administration of Israeli Prime Minister Benjamin Netanyahu. Members of IfNotNow were arrested for interrupting U.S. Ambassador to Israel David M. Friedman's Senate confirmation hearing, blowing a Shofar and criticizing his support and funding of settlements in the West Bank.

References

External links
https://ifnotnowmovement.org/

Jewish anti-occupation groups
Jewish-American political organizations
Non-governmental organizations involved in the Israeli–Palestinian conflict
Political organizations based in the United States